Promises Kept is an album by American jazz pianist and composer Steve Kuhn with strings recorded in 2000 and released on the ECM label.

Reception 
The Allmusic review by Thom Jurek awarded the album 4½ stars stating "this is one of the finest recordings Kuhn has ever issued. Simply put, for all the decades spent adventuring on the boundaries where various traditions blur, the pianist and composer articulate direct emotion as the most effective communicator here, no matter what terrain is navigated in form. A breathtaking and intimate outing, this is a career-topping effort".

Track listing
All compositions by Steve Kuhn.

 "Lullaby" - 4:45
 "Life's Backward Glance" - 5:03
 "Trance" - 8:12
 "Morning Dew" - 5:34
 "Promises Kept" - 5:19
 "Adagio" - 7:31
 "Celtic Princess" - 5:10
 "Nostalgia" - 5:27
 "Oceans in the Sky" - 5:40
 "Pastorale" - 5:40

Personnel
Steve Kuhn - piano
David Finck - bass
String Ensemble conducted by Carlos Franzetti 
Violins - Krista Bennion Feeney, Elizabeth Lim-Dutton, Richard Sortomme, Karl Kawahara, Barry Finclair, Helen Kim, Robert Shaw, Carol Pool, Anca Nicolau
Violas - Sue Pray, Vince Lionti, Karen Ritscher
Celli - Stephanie Cummins, Richard Locker, Joshua Gordon

References

ECM Records albums
Steve Kuhn albums
2004 albums
Albums produced by Manfred Eicher